Filip Bystedt (born 4 February 2004) is a Swedish ice hockey centre for Linköping HC of the Swedish Hockey League (SHL). Bystedt was drafted 27th overall by the San Jose Sharks in the 2022 NHL Entry Draft.

Career statistics

Regular season and playoffs

International

References

External links

2004 births
Living people
Linköping HC players
National Hockey League first-round draft picks
San Jose Sharks draft picks
Sportspeople from Östergötland County
Swedish ice hockey centres